Catherine De Léan (born April 27, 1980) is a Canadian actress. She has been nominated for a 2012 Genie Award for Best Performance by an Actress in a Leading Role for her role in the film Nuit #1. She has appeared in other films and television roles, including Les Hauts et les bas de Sophie Paquin, Trauma, The Secret Life of Happy People (La Vie secrète des gens heureux), Le Banquet, Le Fils de Jean and Confessions of a Hitman (Confessions). She has also appeared on stage.

References

External links

 

Canadian film actresses
Canadian stage actresses
Canadian television actresses
Living people
Actresses from Quebec
1980 births
21st-century Canadian actresses